Mr. Man may refer to:

Mr. Man (website), a pornographic website
Any one of the Mr. Men, characters in a series of children's books
A character in Boohbah, a children's TV programme

See also
Mr. Mann, a character in Little Britain